Patriarch Macarius may refer to:

 Macarius of Jerusalem, Bishop of Jerusalem in 314–333
 Macarius of Bulgaria, Patriarch of Bulgaria c. 1278–1282
 Patriarch Macarius of Constantinople, r. in 1376–1379 and 1390–1391